McDonald's Restaurants of Canada, Limited is the Canadian master franchise of the fast food restaurant chain McDonald's, owned by the American parent McDonald's Corporation. One of Canada's largest fast-food restaurant chains, the franchise sells food items, including hamburgers, chicken, French fries and soft drinks all across the country. McDonald's is known for its high fat and calorie foods, but it also has alternatives such as salads, juice and milk. McDonald's was Canada's largest food service operator before being overtaken by Tim Hortons in 2005. The slogans used in Canada are "i'm lovin' it" in English and "c'est ça que j'm" in French.

McDonald's Canadian operations are based in Don Mills in North York, Toronto. The current McDonald's Canada President is Jacques Mignault. 

McDonald's Canadian logo is identified with the local red maple leaf placed in the company's golden arches.

Origins
Chicago-born George Cohon founded the company. The first store opened in 1967 as the Western Canadian franchisee and operated with the U.S. operations. Cohon was the Eastern Canadian franchise and opened his store in 1968 on Oxford Street West in London, Ontario. In 1971, Cohon merged the two operations to one national operation. Cohon was responsible for developing the eastern Canadian franchises. Western franchise owners opened the first McDonald's restaurant in Canada on June 1, 1967 in Richmond, British Columbia. This McDonald's was the first location opened outside of the United States. As of 2021, McDonald's Canada had 1,452 stores (including restaurants inside many Walmart Canada locations) in Canada, and more than 90,000 Canadian employees.

1980s & 90s 

In the 80s McDonald's saw massive expansion in Canada.  It also was a food sponsor at EXPO 86 with their floating restaurant nicknamed the 'McBarge'.  

In 1989 McDonald's was awarded the concessionary rights to the newly built SkyDome in Toronto.  One of the requirements was to sell hotdogs, resulting in the first time McDonalds sold the product.  Part of the stadium also included the largest McDonalds in Canada.  The now closed restaurant was located at the base of the CN Tower; the location was popular with tourists and is now office space.  

McDonald's restaurants are present in all of the provinces and territories with the exception of Nunavut. The flagship location opened in 2013 near the Yonge-Dundas Square in Toronto.

In 2019, McDonald's Canada donated 50 cents from every medium, large and extra large coffee purchased at these locations, all day long. Last year's event raised more than $10,000 for the Alzheimer Society of Hastings-Prince Edward. In September of that year, McDonald's Canada observed its third annual McDelivery Night.

Products

Executives
As of June 2022:
George A. Cohon, O.C., O.Ont., B.Sc., J.D., Ph.D. (Hon.), Founder
Michele Boudria, President & CEO
Jeff Kroll, Senior Vice President and Chief Strategy Officer
Alex Snelling, Chief People Officer
Jeff McLean, Senior Vice President and Chief Financial Officer

Use of the Temporary Foreign Workers Program 

McDonald's Canada faced severe criticism for its use and alleged abuse of the Temporary Foreign Workers Program (TFWP). Several of its franchises are under federal investigation for abuse of Filipino workers brought into Canada under the TFWP. After a public outcry, McDonald's Canada stated that it would undertake a comprehensive review of its use of TFWP. In a conference call to the franchisees about the program, McDonald's Canada CEO John Betts stated: "the fact of the matter is we are a big bad company corporate you know, bad company. And these poor maligned employees, are who they are ... This has been an attack on our brand ... This is an attack on our people. It's bullshit."  He pointed out that he has spoken with Employment Minister Jason Kenney, and the minister fully understands McDonald's Canada's concerns.  Following this and other similar controversies, the government halted the TFWP for the entire restaurant industry.

Gallery

See also
 List of hamburger restaurants

Notes

References

External links

 Official website

Canadian subsidiaries of foreign companies
Companies based in North York
Restaurants established in 1967
Fast-food chains of Canada
McDonald's subsidiaries
1967 establishments in British Columbia